The women's 100 metre backstroke event at the 2008 Olympic Games took place on 10–12 August at the Beijing National Aquatics Center in Beijing, China.

U.S. swimmer Natalie Coughlin set a lifetime best and an American record of 58.96 to defend her title in the event. Zimbabwe's new world record holder Kirsty Coventry added a second silver to her hardware from the 400 m individual medley two days earlier, in a time of 59.19. Coming from fifth place in the turn, Margaret Hoelzer continued her impressive form in the shorter backstroke to pick up a bronze in 59.34, handing the entire medal haul for Team USA in the pool.

Great Britain's Gemma Spofforth narrowly missed the podium by a twenty-fifth of a second (0.04), posting a European record of 59.38 for a fourth-place finish. Russia's Anastasia Zuyeva finished fifth in a close race at 59.40, and was followed in the sixth spot by Japan's Reiko Nakamura in 59.72. France's Laure Manaudou (1:00.10), bronze medalist in Athens four years earlier, and Japanese Hanae Ito (1:00.18) rounded out the finale.

Earlier in the prelims, Zuyeva, Nakamura, and Coventry scratched out Coughlin's existing Olympic record, as they went under a time of 59.68 to lead all seeded heats. The following morning, in the semifinals, Coventry blitzed the field on the final lap to set a new world record of 58.77, breaking Coughlin's mark by two-tenths of a second (0.20).

Records
Prior to this competition, the existing world and Olympic records were as follows.

The following new world and Olympic records were set during this competition.

Results

Heats

Semifinals

Semifinal 1

Semifinal 2

Final

References

External links
Official Olympic Report

Women's backstroke 100 metre
2008 in women's swimming
Women's events at the 2008 Summer Olympics